The White Countess is a 2005 drama film directed by James Ivory and starring Ralph Fiennes, Natasha Richardson, Vanessa Redgrave, Hiroyuki Sanada, Lynn Redgrave, Allan Corduner, and Madeleine Potter. The screenplay by Kazuo Ishiguro focuses on a disparate group of displaced persons attempting to survive in Shanghai in the late 1930s.

Plot

Having escaped the 1917 Bolshevik Revolution in Russia, Countess Sofia Belinskaya is working as a taxi dancer, if not worse, in a seedy Shanghai bar in 1936 to support her family of aristocratic White Russian émigrés, including her daughter Katya, her mother-in-law Olga, her sister-in-law Grushenka, and an aunt and uncle by marriage, Princess Vera and Prince Peter. Although employment is scarce and her meagre income is almost the Shanghai Russian family's only income, Sofia's relatives scorn her for her work and insist she keep it a secret from her child.

Sofia meets Todd Jackson, a former official of the US State Department who several years earlier lost first his wife and child, then later a daughter in separate terrorist bombings. The bombing that killed his daughter also blinded him. With his job at risk and dreaming of running a nightclub, he gambles his savings on a bet at the racetrack. Winning, he opens an elegant nightclub catering to rich cosmopolites and invites Sofia to be his principal hostess, an offer she accepts; in her honour, he calls the club "The White Countess". Over time, they fall in love, but strive to keep work separate from their personal lives. Both are clearly suffering, and could be of much more help and support for the other. Neither is able to act until prodded by necessity upon the outbreak of the Second Sino-Japanese War. This conflict causes the balanced political climate to disintegrate, followed by a mass exodus from the besieged city.

Cast
 Ralph Fiennes as Todd Jackson
 Natasha Richardson as Countess Sofia Belinskaya
 Hiroyuki Sanada as Mr. Matsuda
 Lynn Redgrave as Olga Belinskaya
 Vanessa Redgrave as Princess Vera Belinskaya
 Madeleine Potter as Grushenka
 Madeleine Daly as Katya
 Lee Pace as Crane
 Allan Corduner as Samuel Feinstein
 John Wood as Prince Peter Belinski

Production

Ismail Merchant had previously worked with British author Kazuo Ishiguro, whose Booker Prize-winning novel The Remains of the Day had been adapted into one of Merchant Ivory's most successful films. Ivory initially asked Ishiguro to adapt the Junichiro Tanizaki novel The Diary of a Mad Old Man, but he wrote an original screenplay based on his obsession with Shanghai. Merchant said: "To have a writer of this calibre working with you is wonderful...I don’t know of any other writer who would be so keenly able to reflect the details of life at that time." 

Andre Morgan joined the project as executive producer and the film used his studio in Shanghai for production and post-production.

In The Making of The White Countess, a bonus feature on the DVD release of the film, production designer Andrew Sanders discusses the difficulties he had recreating 1930s Shanghai in a city where most pre-war remnants are surrounded by modern skyscrapers and neon lights. Many of the sets had to be constructed on soundstages. Also impeding him were restrictions on imports levied by the Chinese government, forcing him to make do with whatever materials he could find within the country. The film was the last for producer Ismail Merchant, who died shortly after principal photography was completed.

Cinematographer Chris Doyle said of his work on the film that "What I'm trying to do is make the camerawork lyrical rather than fragmentary. It's a dance between the camera and the actors."

In 2003, Variety noted the production budget was $16 million, while a 2006 The Guardian article reported the budget at $30 million (£17 million).

Release
The film premiered at the Savannah Film Festival in Savannah, Georgia, and was shown at the Two River Film Festival in Monmouth County, New Jersey, before going into limited release in the US It opened on ten screens, and earned $46,348 on its opening weekend, ranking No. 34 among all films in release. It eventually grossed $1,669,971 in the U.S and $2,422,711 in other markets, for a total worldwide box office of $4,092,682.

Critical response
On Rotten Tomatoes, the film has an approval rating of 49% based on 89 reviews, with average rating of 5.92/10. The website's critical consensus reads, "High production values and fine performances get bogged down by a lifeless story that fails to engage the viewer." On Metacritic, the film has a weighted average score of 60 out of 100, based on reviews from 30 critics, indicating "mixed or average reviews".

Stephen Holden of the New York Times said, "You couldn't ask for a tonier cast than the one that gamely tries to pump oxygen into the thin, filtered air of The White Countess ... But with its tentative pace, fussy, pieced-together structure and stuffy emotional climate, [the film] never develops any narrative stamina ... [It] has the familiar Merchant-Ivory trademarks: cultivated dialogue, a keen eye for the nuances of upscale society and a sophisticated, internationalist view of class and ethnicity. What is missing from a film that wants to be an Asian Casablanca crossed with The English Patient is a racing, dramatic pulse. Its sedate tone is simply too refined for the story it has to tell. Mr. Ishiguro's prim, anemic screenplay is so lacking in drive and emotional gravitas that the actors are left with only scraps of lean dramatic meat to tear into."

Roger Ebert of the Chicago Sun-Times stated, "Fiennes and Richardson make this film work with the quiet strangeness of their performances" and then observed, "I saw my first Merchant and Ivory film, Shakespeare Wallah, in 1965 ... Sometimes they have made great films, sometimes flawed ones, even bad ones, but never shabby or unworthy ones. Here is one that is good to better, poignant, patient, moving."

Mick LaSalle of the San Francisco Chronicle said of the film, "Measured and meticulous, with small patches of narrative awkwardness that are more than compensated for by rich performances, it's an appropriate finish to the 40-year partnership: a typical, above-average Merchant-Ivory film ... The movie has a slow start, but Ivory is laying in foundations for later ... Long before the climax, which is magnificent, the movie has us completely believing in the characters and their histories and marveling at their extraordinary circumstances. This is Merchant-Ivory's kind of showmanship, the unflashy adult variety of movie magic that they made their hallmark."

Carina Chocano of the Los Angeles Times stated, "The Chekovian sight of so many Richardson-Redgraves lamenting their circumstances in heavily Russian-accented English and pining for Hong Kong, where their former social glory will be restored, makes you wonder if they'd have been better off in a stage production of Three and a Half Sisters: The Twilight Years ... The White Countess takes place in a fascinating time and place, rife with conflict and turmoil. But to watch Fiennes float (and Richardson trudge) through it all, absorbed in themselves and their own private misery, is to wish they'd started falling earlier, if only to knock some sense into them."

Peter Travers of Rolling Stone rated the film three out of four stars and commented, "The convoluted screenplay ... makes it hard for director James Ivory to maintain an emotional through-line. But Richardson ... finds the story's grieving heart. Fiennes is her match in soulful artistry. As the last film from the legendary team of Ivory and producer Ismail Merchant ... The White Countess is a stirring tribute to Merchant, a true builder of dreams in an industry now sorely bereft of his unique spirit."

Justin Chang of Variety stated, "The threads come together ever so slowly in The White Countess ... This final production from the team of James Ivory and the late Ismail Merchant is itself adrift in more ways than one, with a literate but meandering script ... that withholds emotional payoffs to an almost perverse degree. Name cast and typically tasteful presentation should spark biz among sophisticated older viewers, though likely a fraction of what the Merchant Ivory pedigree used to command theatrically."

Accolades
John Bright was nominated for the Satellite Award for Best Costume Design, and Michael Barry, Martin Czembor, Ludovic Hénault, and Robert Hein were nominated for the Satellite Award for Best Sound.

See also
 The Shanghai Drama (1938)
 A Countess from Hong Kong (1967)

References

External links
 Sony Classics website
 Merchant Ivory website
 
 The White Countess Stills, image gallery from Production Designer Andrew Sanders

2005 films
2000s historical drama films
British historical drama films
Films about blind people
Films directed by James Ivory
Films set in 1936
Films set in 1937
Films set in Shanghai
Merchant Ivory Productions films
Films with screenplays by Kazuo Ishiguro
Second Sino-Japanese War films
Sony Pictures Classics films
2005 drama films
2000s English-language films
2000s British films